Re-education or reeducation may refer to:

 The process of retraining a person's capacity of movement, for example after a stroke or injury has impaired a person's ability to move and sense their own movement; an element of physiotherapy
 Re-education through labor, a system of administrative detention in Mainland China from 1957 to 2013
 "Re-Education (Through Labor)", a song by Rise Against from the 2008 album Appeal to Reason

See also
 Brainwashing
 Involuntary political indocrination
 Re-education camp (disambiguation)